Comitas vezo is a species of sea snails, a marine gastropod mollusc in the family Pseudomelatomidae, the turrids and allies.

Description
The length of the shell attains 47 mm.

Distribution
This marine species occurs off Madagascar.

References

 Bozzetti, L., 2001. Tre nuove specie (Mollusca, Gastropoda) dal Madagascar sud-occidentale. Malacologia Mostra Mondiale 33: 17-19

External links
 Holotype at MNHN, Paris
 

vezo
Gastropods described in 2001